Tell Rifaat Subdistrict  is a subdistrict of Azaz District in northwestern Aleppo Governorate of northern Syria. Administrative centre is the town of Tell Rifaat.

At the 2004 census, the subdistrict had a population of 43,781.

Cities, towns and villages

References 

Azaz District
Tell Rifaat